Murat Sözgelmez (born 21 August 1985) is a Turkish retired professional footballer who played as a center back.

Career
Sözgelmez began his career with local club İzmir G.S.K. in 1999. He spent two years with the club before moving to another local club, Altay, in 2002. Sözgelmez began playing for the first team in 2004, and was transferred to Sivasspor in 2006. He has been a constant fixture in the side, making 103 appearances and scoring five goals in four seasons.

International career
Sözgelmez has been capped by the Turkey B national football team once, in a friendly against Romania in 2008.

References

1985 births
Living people
Footballers from İzmir
Turkish footballers
Turkey B international footballers
Altay S.K. footballers
Sivasspor footballers
Çaykur Rizespor footballers
Balıkesirspor footballers
Antalyaspor footballers
Elazığspor footballers
MKE Ankaragücü footballers
Süper Lig players
TFF First League players
Association football defenders